William Hunt (1842–1931) was an English clergyman and historian.

Life

He was educated at Harrow School and Trinity College, Oxford. He was vicar of Congresbury, Somerset from 1867 to 1882, and then went to London as a reviewer and contributor to the Dictionary of National Biography.  He was President of the Royal Historical Society from 1905 to 1909.

Works

He wrote:
 The Somerset Diocese, Bath and Wells (1885)
 Bristol (1887), part of the 'Historic Towns' series edited by Hunt and Prof. Edward Augustus Freeman.
 The English Church in the Middle Ages (1888)
 The English Church, 597-1066 (1899), the first volume in a series of which he was editor
 the tenth volume of Political History of England (1905–07), of which he was joint editor with R. Lane-Poole
 The Irish Parliament (1907), edited from a contemporary manuscript.

References

Further reading
Oxford Dictionary of National Biography,  Hunt, William (1842–1931), historian and biographer by Robert W. Dunning.

External links
 
 

1842 births
1931 deaths
19th-century English Anglican priests
19th-century English historians
People educated at Harrow School
Alumni of Trinity College, Oxford
Presidents of the Royal Historical Society
20th-century English historians